The 1900 VPI football team represented Virginia Agricultural and Mechanical College and Polytechnic Institute in the 1900 college football season. The team was led by their head coach Eugene Davis and finished with a record of three wins, three losses, and one tie (3–3–1).

Hunter Carpenter used the alias "Walter Brown" because his father had forbidden him to play football.  It was not until his father saw him play in a game in 1900 against Virginia Military Institute in Norfolk, Virginia did he approve.

Schedule

Original schedule 
The 1900 football schedule for VPI listed on October 7 in The Times was as follows:

October 6 – St. Albans in Blacksburg, Virginia (played on this date)
October 13 – Roanoke in Salem, Virginia (game was not played)
October 20 – St. Albans in Radford, Virginia (played on this date)
October 24 – North Carolina in Chapel Hill, North Carolina (game was moved to October 27)
October 26 – North Carolina A&M in Raleigh, North Carolina (game was moved to October 25)
November 3 – Richmond in Richmond, Virginia (game was not played)
November 10 – Guilford in Blacksburg (game was not played)
November 24 – Washington and Lee in Blacksburg (game was not played)
November 29 – VMI in either Roanoke, Virginia (listed on the VPI schedule) or Norfolk, Virginia (listed on the VMI schedule) (played on this date in Roanoke). On October 30, VPI informed VMI that they refused to play in Norfolk. VMI offered to increase VPI's percentage of ticket sales or pay for travel expenses, but VPI declined and the game was called off temporarily. VMI eventually acceded to VPI's demands and moved the game to Roanoke.
According to the article, VPI also planned on scheduling games with Maryland and Tennessee, but neither game occurred. The Virginia game was initially scheduled to be played in Blacksburg, but was ultimately played in Charlottesville, Virginia.

On October 9, 1900 the Richmond Dispatch listed a different schedule. The differences were:

The schedule listed October 13 as "open", instead of against Roanoke.
The schedule correctly listed the North Carolina game on October 27, instead of October 24.
The schedule listed the Virginia game for November 7 (this game was eventually played on November 14).
The schedule listed a Tennessee game for November 14 that was "being arranged" (this game was not played).

According to the article, VPI also planned on pursuing games with Randolph–Macon, William & Mary, Georgetown, Hampden–Sydney, and Southern Business College. However, none of these games were scheduled.

Players
The following players were members of the 1900 football team according to the roster published in the 1901 and 1903 editions of The Bugle, the Virginia Tech yearbook.

References

VPI
Virginia Tech Hokies football seasons
VPI football